Scrobipalpa divisella is a moth in the family Gelechiidae. It was described by Rebel in 1936. It is found in Spain and Turkey.

References

Scrobipalpa
Moths described in 1936